Yossi Avni-Levy (born 25 May 1962) is an Israeli writer and diplomat. He has served in various positions in Israeli embassies in Berlin, Bonn, Belgrade, and Warsaw.  He is Israel’s ambassador to Lithuania.  From 2011 until 2016, he was Ambassador to Serbia.

Avni-Levy is the author of the books Garden of the dead trees, Four sons, Auntie Farhuma wasn't a whore after all, A man without shadow and Ode of the Sins.  He has been awarded with the Prime Minister's Prize for Literature.

Biography
Avni-Levy was born 25 May 1962, to an Afghan Jewish father and an Iranian Jewish mother. He graduated with honors from Hebrew University in Jerusalem in history of the Middle East and Arabic in 1983, earning a bachelor of laws (LLB) degree from the Faculty of Law in 1991.

Avni-Levy's writing is personal and poetic and is noteworthy for its intimacy. The extended periods he has spent outside Israel on diplomatic postings are reflected in his works. He published short stories under the pen name Yossi Avni in the literary supplements to Maariv and Haaretz. He won first prize in Hebrew University's annual contest in 1988, first prize in a contest sponsored by "At (You)" in 1991, and third prize in the Haaretz short story contest for his story "Pains" in 1991. His travelogue, "Journey," was included in the first issue of the journal Rechov (Street). Several of his stories were included in anthologies in German, Italian, and English. Avni has also published book reviews (Haaretz, Yedioth Aharonoth) and literary reports ("Cappuccino in Three Crosses Square," Haaretz literary and cultural supplement, January 2007). Avni's story "Journey" was also included in the 1998 collection 50 Years, 50 Stories : a selection of short stories edited by Zisi Satuy of Yidioth Aharonoth. His story "Nice Words of Farewell" was included in the collection Murder Close to Home : stories about murders of Israelis edited by Dorit Zilberman and Aviva Gefen and published by Keter in 2001.

He was invited by the Polish Literature Association to give lectures in Poland (Warsaw, Krakow, Katowice) in September 2007 and gave lectures on his writing at Harvard, Yale, Cornell and Brandeis universities in the United States in April 2008.

He is openly gay.

Writings
 1995: The Garden of Dead Trees (Heb. Gan Ha-Etzim Ha-Metim), published in German, by Suhrkamp Verlag/Frankfurt and by Männerschwarm Verlag/Hamburg.
 1998: Four Sons (Heb. Arba'a Banim)
 2003: Auntie Farhuma wasn't a whore, after all (Heb. Doda Farhuma Lo Haita Zona), published in Polish Sic! publishing house.
 2007: A man without shadow (Heb. Ish Lelo Tzel), published in Serbian by Narodna biblioteka Srbije.
 2010: Ode of the Sins (Heb. Shira HaHataim)

References

External links
Official website

1962 births
Israeli Mizrahi Jews
Jewish novelists
Gay diplomats
Israeli LGBT novelists
Living people
Israeli gay writers
Israeli male short story writers
Israeli short story writers
Israeli people of Iranian-Jewish descent
Israeli people of Afghan-Jewish descent
Afghan Jews
Gay novelists
Gay Jews
Meretz politicians
Ambassadors of Israel to Lithuania
Ambassadors of Israel to Serbia